Estonian Motorcycling Federation (abbreviation EMF) is one of the sport governing bodies in Estonia which deals with motorcycling.

EMF history dates back to 1921 when Estonian Auto Club was established. One of the section of this club was motorcycling section. Since 1932 this section was a member of International Motorcycling Federation (FIM).

EMF was re-established in 1992. Since 2001, EMF is also a member of Estonian Olympic Committee.

References

External links
 

Sports governing bodies in Estonia
Motorsport in Estonia